Barbus rosae is a species of cyprinid fish in the genus Barbus.

Footnotes 

 

Endemic fauna of Angola
R
Fish described in 1910